Tinker Knob is an 8,949-foot-elevation (2,728 meter) mountain summit in Placer County, California, United States.

Description
It is situated on the crest of the Sierra Nevada mountain range, with precipitation runoff from the peak draining west to North Fork American River and east to the Truckee River via Deep Creek and Cold Creek. The Pacific Crest Trail traverses the peak, providing an approach option from Donner Pass or Palisades Tahoe, and inclusion on the Sierra Peaks Section peakbagging list generates climbing interest.

History

This landform's toponym has been officially adopted by the U.S. Board on Geographic Names, and has appeared in publications since at least 1874. The name commemorates James A. Tinker, a freight-hauling teamster whose road between Tinker's Station (now known as Soda Springs) and gold mines at Foresthill Divide passed below this peak to the west. More specifically, the landform's name is a humorous reference to a resemblance to Tinker's nose.

Climate
According to the Köppen climate classification system, Tinker Knob is located in an alpine climate zone. Most weather fronts originate in the Pacific Ocean and travel east toward the Sierra Nevada mountains. As fronts approach, they are forced upward by the peaks (orographic lift), causing them to drop their moisture in the form of rain or snowfall onto the range.

See also

References

External links
 Weather forecast: Tinker Knob
 Tinker Knob (photo): Flickr

North American 2000 m summits
Mountains of Northern California
Tahoe National Forest
Mountains of the Sierra Nevada (United States)
Mountains of Placer County, California